Lion of Oz and the Badge of Courage is a children's book written by Roger S. Baum, great-grandson of the author of the original Oz series, L. Frank Baum. It was first published in 1995 by Yellow Brick Road Press.

Plot
The Lion and Oscar both work in the circus, but when they go for a ride in Oscar's hot-air balloon, they find themselves in Oz. But the Lion falls out of the balloon and is separated from his friend. Once in Oz he finds that he can talk and soon meets up with the Wicked Witch of the East. The witch sends Lion on a journey to find the Flower of Oz, the source of all things good in the land. On his way he meets a mysterious girl who is accompanied by animated toys, and they set off together to find the Flower of Oz. On the way they come to many adventures, an evil seamstress who's working for the Wicked Witch of the East, mini munchkins, and The Wizard of Oz himself. But if Lion doesn't find the flower in time, he will lose his badge of courage to the witch.

Prior to 'The Wizard of Oz'
After landing in the land of Oz, Lion of Oz depicts the Lion on a quest to reunite with his friend, the Wizard of Oz. For the duration of the quest, the Lion has a Badge of Courage which makes him exceedingly brave. As he travels across the land, he finds himself repeatedly threatened and manipulated by the Wicked Witch of the East.

At the end of this story, he befriends the Flower of Oz, a seemingly great magical power that the witch seeks; Together the two defeat the Witch. However, the Lion's Badge of Courage is broken in the process and he becomes cowardly. In shame, he leaves his friends and takes off on his own through the forests, where he eventually meets Dorothy, the Tin Man, and the Scarecrow.

The Lion travels with Dorothy, the Tin Woodman, the Scarecrow, and Toto on the yellow brick road on their journey to see the Wizard of Oz. He tells his new companions that he is cowardly and wishes to see the wizard to regain his courage.

However, during the course of the book, the Cowardly Lion seems to be the bravest member of the party, showing a willingness to stand by and defend his friends even if it involves certain death. When the group reaches the Emerald City at the end of the book, the Wizard gives the Lion a placebo Badge of Courage which makes him believe he has regained his courageous nature.

It was made into a 2000 film titled Lion of Oz.

Oz (franchise) books
1995 American novels
1995 fantasy novels
American fantasy novels adapted into films
1995 children's books
American children's books
Books about lions